"Renaissance Man" is the 170th episode of Star Trek: Voyager, and the last standard-length episode of the seventh season (and series). The succeeding episode, "Endgame", is a double-length episode and the series finale.

Plot
En route from a medical conference back to Voyager, the Delta Flyer carrying Captain Janeway and the holographic Doctor is captured by Zet and Nar, ex-members of the Hierarchy. They keep Janeway in captivity and force the Doctor to return to Voyager using disguises enabled by his holo-emitter to get the crew to turn over the warp core and several gel-paks. Zet inserts programming into the Doctor's program to allow them to directly monitor and communicate with him. As the Doctor leaves, Janeway starts talking to Nar in secret away from Zet, hoping to gain his trust.

The Doctor, disguised as Janeway, returns to Voyager in the Delta Flyer and creates a fake transmission from a race called the R'Kaal; the R'Kaal transmission describes the area of space they are in as highly unstable to warp fields, and demands Voyager turns over the warp core, while allowing the crew to settle on a nearby class-M planet. The Doctor — as Janeway — has the Delta Flyer modified to be able to tractor the warp core away should it become unstable. The crew is uneasy at "Janeway's" willingness to give over the warp core so easily, forcing the Doctor to try to hide his tracks, including sedating Chakotay and Kim when they come too close to discovering his identity.

Eventually, Tuvok succeeds in discovering the Doctor's deception and goes to the Sick Bay to confront him. He finds the Doctor listening to "The Blue Danube", which the Doctor has been using to mask his communications to Zet from the ship's internal sensors. The Doctor flees via hologram, triggers the ejection of the warp core, and escapes with it using the modified Delta Flyer, leaving no trail that the crew can follow. Shortly afterwards, all the computer systems across the ship begin playing "The Blue Danube", and Seven of Nine recognizes that some of the notes are not correct. They discover the Doctor secretly left a coded message within the recording, and use it to find a warp signature that they can trace. Tuvok and Paris leave in a separate shuttle to follow it.

The Doctor returns to the Hierarchy fleet and is recaptured despite Janeway's orders to not give over the warp core. With the mission considered a success, Zet decides to use the Doctor to similarly infiltrate the Hierarchy's command structure to gain valuable information and begins to program the Doctor with a Hierarchy holo-profile. The volume of data in the profile causes the Doctor's matrix to begin to destabilize. Just then, Tuvok and Paris arrive and begin firing on Zet's ship. Zet tries to eject the warp core with the intent of destroying it and the Voyager shuttle, but the Doctor struggles with Zet to prevent him from firing upon it. In the meantime, Janeway succeeds in beaming out the warp core to where Tom Paris in the Delta Flyer could tractor it back to Voyager. Zet orders Nar to help him fend off the Doctor but Nar, now seeing Zet's recklessness, helps the Doctor to subdue Zet.

With Nar's help, Janeway, the Doctor, and the warp core are recovered and they return quickly to Voyager to help fix the Doctor's destabilizing program. The Doctor bemoans that he will soon die, and makes several deathbed confessions, including professing his love for Seven. However, Torres manages to fix his matrix. The Doctor isolates himself in the Sick Bay for a week, embarrassed about his confessions and believing that the crew will hate him for his deception. Janeway visits him and assures him that no one has any hostile feelings towards him, and invites him for coffee in the holodeck.

Reactions
"Renaissance Man" was rated the 2nd best episode of season 7 of Star Trek: Voyager in 2018. It was rated 2.5 stars out of 4 by another review site.

References

External links
 

2001 American television episodes
Star Trek: Voyager (season 7) episodes
Holography in television